No One Must Know is a 1962 children's novel by the English writer Barbara Sleigh. The story concerns a small group of children living in English town, sandwiched between a railway and a warehouse, in a row of rented, white-painted terraced houses, where the landlord will allow no pets.

Story line
The story begins with the arrival of new tenants at Number Six, an end-house in Cumberland Place, which is a poky town-centre street sandwiched between a railway and a warehouse. The incoming family consists of a little girl, Jenny Hawthorn, and her father (she has lost her mother in a car crash), and a cat named Thomas (p. 14). The girl's face is described as "sprinkled with freckles – as freely as an apple charlotte is with brown sugar." The pet problem is one that she manages to share immediately with other children in the street: "'Is it true? ... No pets?'" Barty nodded. 'I say, whatever shall I do?'" (p. 11).

The problem has been compounded overnight, when Thomas turns out to be a female cat and gives birth to four kittens. Jenny and two of her new neighbours, Barty Fergus and Molly Dudgeon, find a secret place for them on a piece of waste land, which they call Tom Tiddler's Ground. This is out of sight of the landlord, nicknamed Old Cockles after this surname Mussels: "I won't have it. Insanitary, do you hear?" (p. 13). Three other children from the Place – Sam, Midge and Molly's younger brother Tony – are brought into the secret.

The story then delves into several further problems: a spy among the children (p. 67 ff.), train-spotters who frequent the path behind the houses (p. 79 ff.), a delinquent youth who uses the waste ground to store goods he has stolen (p. 110 ff.), and the prospect of the houses themselves being demolished.

A detailed map of the area is provided (pp. 184–185).

Editions
The UK first edition by Collins of 1962 was followed by a US edition by Bobbs-Merrill in the following year and by a further UK reprint in Collins's revived Evergreen Library in 1968. The book appeared in a Dutch translation in 1963 and a German translation in 1974.

The book was intended for children of about ten and upwards. It is not currently in print.

TV series
The book became the basis of a Jackanory BBC children's television series of five 15-minute parts in 1969, directed and adapted by Jeremy Swan. The narrator was Robert Swann and the part of Jenny was played by Lorraine Windsor.

References

1962 British novels
1962 children's books
British children's novels
English novels
Novels about cats
Novels by Barbara Sleigh
William Collins, Sons books